Johan van Napels (1556 – 1630), was a Dutch Golden Age mayor of Haarlem.

Biography
He was the son of Jan Jacobsz Koeckebacker and Duyfje van Napels. He married Adriana Bovetius in 1581 and married a second time to Catharina Zuyderhoeff. He became a judge, magistrate and mayor of Haarlem. He was lieutenant of the Haarlem combined militia from 1587-1588, lieutenant of the St. George militia from 1597-1600, captain 1606-1609, and fiscaal/provost 1609-1621. He moved to Beverwijk in 1629, but died the following year there. He was portrayed by Frans Hals in The Banquet of the Officers of the St George Militia Company in 1616.

References

Johan van Napels in De Haarlemse Schuttersstukken, by Jhr. Mr. C.C. van Valkenburg, pp. 66, Haerlem : jaarboek 1958, ISSN 0927-0728, on the website of the North Holland Archives

1556 births
1630 deaths
Frans Hals
People from Haarlem
Mayors of Haarlem